Colquhounia is a genus of about six species of evergreen or semi-evergreen shrubs or subshrubs in the family Lamiaceae, first described in 1822. They are native to the Himalaya and southwestern China south to Peninsular Malaysia.

The flowers are tubular, two-lipped, and carried on terminal spikes.

Species include:
 Colquhounia coccinea Wall. - Tibet, Yunnan, Bhutan, Assam, Arunachal Pradesh, Myanmar, Nepal, Thailand 
 Colquhounia compta W.W.Sm. - Sichuan, Yunnan 
 Colquhounia elegans Wall. - Yunnan, Myanmar, Thailand, Vietnam, Laos, Cambodia  
 Colquhounia seguinii Vaniot - Guangxi, Guizhou, Hubei, Sichuan, Yunnan, Myanmar 
 Colquhounia vestita Wall. - Yunnan, Assam, Bhutan, Nepal, Himalayas of northern + eastern India

References

Lamiaceae
Lamiaceae genera